This Is All Yours is the second album by English indie rock band alt-J, released on September 22, 2014 through Infectious. It was promoted with four singles: "Hunger of the Pine", "Left Hand Free", "Every Other Freckle", and "Warm Foothills". It topped the UK Albums Chart, was runner up in Belgium, Australia, and Canada and reached #4 in the United States. It was nominated for the Grammy Award for Best Alternative Music Album.

Background and recording 
On May 25, 2012, Alt-J released their debut album An Awesome Wave, which won the Mercury Prize in 2012. Alt-J were also nominated for three Brit Awards (British Breakthrough Act, British Album of the Year and British Group of the Year). Bassist Gwil Sainsbury left the band in January 2014. The band began recording the album in April 2014. It was recorded in the same place as An Awesome Wave, Iguana Studios, which Gus Unger-Hamilton described as "a tiny little place, sort of behind a second hand tyre shop".

Music 
The majority of the songs on the album were written while touring their debut album, An Awesome Wave, while newer ones such as "Hunger of the Pine" were written in "a really cool little converted Warehouse in Hackney, very cliché East London". Unger-Hamilton said that the "song cycle" of the album is made up of "Arrival in Nara", "Nara" and "Leaving Nara", Nara being a city in Japan. "Hunger of the Pine" was one of the songs written after their bass player Gwil Sainsbury left in January 2014. The song features a sample of "4x4" by Miley Cyrus, of her singing "I'm a female rebel". The sample originally came from a remix Thom Green, Alt-J's drummer, made for Miley Cyrus. Joe Newman said "I was playing the guitar and Thom was responding to what I was doing on Ableton and before we knew it, we'd come up with this really interesting structure, and I came up with lyrics for it quite quickly." Gus Unger-Hamilton said "it sounded cool with what Joe was playing on the guitar." The band asked Miley Cyrus if they could use the sample; according to Newman, she was "cool with it". He said that Miley Cyrus has "been really supportive of us, and she's a fan, I think, which is really nice."

Release 
On June 9, 2014, the band announced the release of their second album This Is All Yours, as well as putting pre-orders for the album on their website. The album was released on September 22, 2014, as a download, on CD and double vinyl. On June 13, alt-J posted a video on their Instagram account featuring a clip of the first single "Hunger of the Pine". The single premiered on Zane Lowe's show on BBC Radio 1 on June 18. The song was streamed later that day, and released as a single on the iTunes Store the next. "Left Hand Free" was released digitally on 7 July 2014 as the album's second single and impacted modern rock radio on 15 July 2014.

On 13 August 2014, the album's third single, "Every Other Freckle", premiered on Zane Lowe's BBC Radio 1 show once again.

On 9 September 2014, the band released an app that gave access to the album when the user was in select locations.

On 15 September 2014, the band made the album available to listen to on music-streaming platform Spotify.

On 2 March 2015, the band released "Warm Foothills" as the fourth and final single from the album.

Critical reception 

Upon its release, This Is All Yours received generally positive reviews from music critics.  At Metacritic, which assigns a normalized rating out of 100 to reviews from mainstream critics, the album received an average score of 70, based on 26 reviews, indicating "generally favorable reviews".

Accolades
The album was nominated at the 57th Grammy Awards for Best Alternative Music Album, and for IMPALA's European Independent Album of the Year Award.

Commercial performance
This Is All Yours debuted at number one on the UK's Official Albums Chart on 28 September 2014.
In Canada, the album debuted at number two on the Canadian Albums Chart, selling 14,000 copies in its first week. The album fell behind Leonard Cohen's Popular Problems.

Track listing

Personnel
Adapted from LP liner notes.

Alt-J
Joe Newman – guitar, bass, lead vocals
Thom Green – drums
Gus Unger-Hamilton – keyboards, backing vocals

Additional musicians
Kirsty Mangan – strings
Tim Rundle – penny whistle, recorder

Technical
Charlie Andrew – production
Brett Cox – engineering, guitar (10)
Dick Beetham – mastering
RCA – mastering

Chart performance

Weekly charts

Year-end charts

Certifications

References 

2014 albums
Alt-J albums
Folktronica albums
Infectious Music albums
Albums produced by Charlie Andrew